Dietrich Markwart Eberhart Mateschitz (20 May 1944 – 22 October 2022) was an Austrian billionaire businessman. He was the co-founder and 49% owner of Red Bull GmbH. In April 2022, Mateschitz's net worth was estimated at US$27.4 billion.

Mateschitz worked in marketing for Unilever and Blendax. While travelling in Thailand, he discovered the drink Krating Daeng, which he adapted into Red Bull. He founded Red Bull GmbH in 1984 and launched it in Austria in 1987. His company acquired or founded several sports teams around the world, including five-time Constructors' Champions Red Bull Racing and sister team AlphaTauri in Formula One, and association football teams including FC Red Bull Salzburg and RB Leipzig.

Early life and education

Mateschitz was born on 20 May 1944, in Sankt Marein im Mürztal, Styria, Austria, to a family of Slovene or Croatian ancestry. His mother's side was from Styria, his father's side was from Maribor (now in Slovenia); some sources place his ancestry in the area of Zadar where he allegedly had relatives and the surname Matešić was common. He declared himself a "Styrian cosmopolitan". Both his parents were school teachers. He attended the Hochschule für Welthandel (now Vienna University of Economics and Business), where after ten years, he graduated with a marketing degree in 1972. He was keen and passionate about extreme sports at an early age.

Career
Mateschitz's first employer was Unilever, where he worked marketing detergents. He subsequently moved to Blendax, the German cosmetics company (since bought by Procter & Gamble), where he worked on, among other things, the marketing of Blendax toothpaste. It was as part of his travels for Blendax, on the way from Bangkok airport to the city centre, that Mateschitz bought a bottle of Krating Daeng, the drink that would later become Red Bull. "One glass [of Krating Daeng] and the jet lag was gone", he recalled. Sensing the commercial opportunities of this drink in Europe, Mateschitz struck a partnership deal with the Thai businessman Chaleo Yoovidhya who had already been successfully selling Krating Daeng to lorry drivers and factory workers.

In 1984, he founded Red Bull GmbH with Yoovidhya, launching the brand in Austria in 1987. Subsequently, he turned the Red Bull drink into a world market leader among energy drinks. It was revealed that he worked on the formula for around three years before the modified drink was launched under the new name Red Bull in 1987.

Mateschitz also owned Seitenblicke, Austria's top society magazine, but avoided the celebrity circuit and watched most Formula One races on TV despite owning two teams. He also founded Media House in Austria in 2007 by providing various digital entertainment and thousands of hours of images to interested broadcasters.

Mateschitz owned ServusTV, a television channel based in Salzburg. The channel was criticised for allegedly downplaying the seriousness of the COVID-19 pandemic. The channel is considered to have a right-wing position, and was one of only three media outlets given a press pass to the "Defenders of Europe" conference of right-wing and far-right activists in October 2016. In May 2016, Mateschitz announced he would shut down the channel as his employees had requested to form a works council; he changed his mind when no such council was formed.

Sports
Mateschitz's brands are consistently marketed as associated with the physical and mental attributes needed for various types of extreme sports such as surfing, skydiving, cliff diving, winter sports and mountain biking through commercial sponsorship. Under his tenure, Red Bull was widely acclaimed for its creative and intensive marketing of extreme sports. The successful high altitude skydiving exploration from the edge of space which was carried out by Red Bull Stratos in collaboration with Felix Baumgartner in October 2012 is considered as one of the turning points in Red Bull's history in terms of its intensive marketing strategies in the context of extreme sports.

Motorsport
Red Bull formerly owned more than 60 percent of the Sauber Formula One motor racing team, and was the team's main sponsor. However, Red Bull ended its relationship with Sauber at the end of 2001 after the team opted to sign Kimi Räikkönen as one of their drivers for the 2001 season instead of Red Bull protege Enrique Bernoldi. In November 2004, Mateschitz bought the failing Jaguar Racing Formula One team from its previous owners, Ford, and he renamed it as a full-blown Red Bull Racing team for the following season in 2005. The fee was undisclosed. Red Bull recruited former Formula-2 driver Christian Horner as team principal while also bringing one of the sport's leading design engineer Adrian Newey on board as the technical director for a salary of $10m.

In September 2005, Mateschitz joined forces with his close friend and former Formula One driver, Gerhard Berger, to purchase the Italian-registered Minardi team from its Australian owner Paul Stoddart. This team was meant to serve as a Junior team to Red Bull Racing and was renamed as Scuderia Toro Rosso in 2006, and then AlphaTauri in 2020.

Sebastian Vettel won the 2008 Italian Grand Prix for Toro Rosso. His victory at the 2009 Chinese Grand Prix was the first for Red Bull Racing. In 2010, Red Bull Racing won the Formula One World Constructors' Championship and Vettel won the Drivers' Championship. They then went on to win both titles for the next three years running in 2011, 2012, and 2013. Eight years later they won the Formula One World Drivers' Championship again with Max Verstappen in the 2021 season, while finishing runners-up in the Formula One World Constructors' Championship which was won by Mercedes. In the 2022 season, Verstappen retained his title, the sixth by a Red Bull driver. Prior to Max Verstappen's heroics, Red Bull endured a rough patch and lean phase having gone winless in the Constructor's Championship for around eight years, coinciding with the arrival of F1's turbo-hybrid engines which first came into the picture in 2014 that even led to a fallout with their main engine supplier Renault. Red Bull made a dramatic turnaround in both 2021 and 2022 seasons albeit of a reunion with Honda which put an end to an eight-year title drought that was eluded largely due to the domination of Mercedes from 2014 to 2020.

From 2006 to 2011, Mateschitz also owned Team Red Bull who competed in the NASCAR Sprint Cup Series and the K&N Pro Series East.

In late 2004, he bought the A1-Ring racing circuit, which had formerly hosted the Formula One Austrian Grand Prix, and renamed it the Red Bull Ring. The circuit re-opened in May 2011 and hosted a round of the 2011 Deutsche Tourenwagen Masters season. Although Mateschitz had stated that there were no plans for it to return to the Formula One calendar, in December 2012 Red Bull notified the Fédération Internationale de l'Automobile they would be open to hosting a Grand Prix. In July 2013, Red Bull announced the return of the Austrian Grand Prix to the Formula One World Championship in 2014. The race took place on 22 June 2014 and was won by Nico Rosberg, driving for Mercedes.

Football and ice hockey

In April 2005, he bought the Austrian football club SV Austria Salzburg and in March 2006, he bought the American club MetroStars; both clubs were subsequently renamed after his famous drink, as Red Bull Salzburg and New York Red Bulls, respectively. In 2007, Red Bull founded Red Bull Brasil, a football team based in Campinas, and in 2019 the company acquired Clube Atlético Bragantino also in the state of São Paulo. In 2008, Red Bull founded Red Bull Ghana, a football academy in Sogakope which was sold to Dutch club Feyenoord in 2014.

In May 2009, he initiated a German football club called RB Leipzig after buying the license from SSV Markranstädt to play in the Oberliga, the fourth tier of the German football league system. The team rose to the top-tier Bundesliga in 2016, made the UEFA Champions League semi-finals in 2020 and won the DFB-Pokal in 2022.

He was also the owner of the ice hockey clubs EC Red Bull Salzburg and EHC Red Bull München, which were acquired and rebranded in 2000 and 2012  respectively.

Philanthropy 
Mateschitz was co-founder of the Wings for Life foundation that supports spinal cord research together with Heinz Kinigadner. Since 2014, the foundation has organised the Wings for Life World Run to raise funds.

Mateschitz personally donated 70 million euros to Paracelsus Medical University for a research center on spinal cord injuries.

He also initiated the World Stunt Awards, an annual fundraiser to benefit his Taurus Foundation, which, according to its website, helps injured stunt professionals.

Personal life and death
Mateschitz never married, but had a son named Mark, who was born in May 1992. As of the time of Mateschitz's death, his son was the managing director of one of his investment companies. Mateschitz rarely gave interviews, and refused to answer questions about his son. He remained a reclusive figure maintaining low profile despite his heavy involvement with Formula One. He was also known for his simplicity often seen wearing casual dresswear preferably in jeans and sunglasses. Mateschitz was in a relationship for two years with the mother of his son, and later had a long-term partner named Marion Feichtner. He was known as a recluse, stating "I don't believe in 50 friends. I believe in a smaller number. Nor do I care about society events. It's the most senseless use of time. When I do go out, from time to time, it's just to convince myself again that I'm not missing a lot".

He held a pilot's licence and enjoyed flying a Falcon 900 and a Piper Super Cub. He had his own hangar with a collection of old planes, including the last Douglas DC-6B to be produced, and which once belonged to Yugoslav Marshal Josip Broz Tito.

Mateschitz and his Bundesliga club RB Leipzig faced backlash in 2017 over comments made in a Kleine Zeitung interview in which he suggested that Austria should close its borders to refugees and expressed support for Donald Trump and other populist positions. He went on to strongly criticize both the Government of Germany and the Government of Austria for their policies during the 2015 European migrant crisis.

Mateschitz lived in Fuschl am See, Austria but also owned the island of Laucala in Fiji, which he bought from the Forbes family for £7 million. He spent millions on acquiring and conserving houses and castles in the Austrian Alps, saying "I want to enjoy these places myself, but I also want to take care of them".

He died following a long period of fighting pancreatic cancer at his home in St. Wolfgang im Salzkammergut on 22 October 2022, at age 78.

See also
 The World's Billionaires

References

External links

 Forbes.com: The Soda With Buzz
 Times Online: Big man drives forward energy-packed brand – The media-shy mogul behind the Red Bull phenomenon
 Die-Wirtschaftsnews: The man beyond Red Bull (German)

1944 births
2022 deaths
Austrian billionaires
Austrian chief executives
Austrian drink industry businesspeople
Austrian football chairmen and investors
Austrian mass media people
Austrian motorsport people
Austrian people of Croatian descent
Chairmen and investors of football clubs in Austria
Chairmen and investors of football clubs in Germany
Chairmen and investors of soccer clubs in the United States
Dietrich Mateschitz
Formula One team owners
Red Bull people
FC Red Bull Salzburg non-playing staff
Red Bull Racing
Scuderia Toro Rosso
Vienna University of Economics and Business alumni
Deaths from pancreatic cancer